Sergio Gil is the name of:

 Sergio Gil (footballer, born 1996), Spanish footballer
 Sérgio Gil (footballer, born 1970), Brazilian footballer